Pedro María Piqueras Gómez (May 6, 1955) is a Spanish journalist and news anchor, currently is news director of Telecinco.

Biography

Early life
Piqueras graduated from the Complutense University of Madrid during the mid-1970s.

RNE (1977–1988)
In 1977 Piqueras joined at the RNE crew as news reader of the Foreign Radio of Spain and the international area of RNE. Some years later was director of the weekend news programs and other shows as "Al Cabo de la Calle" and "Abrimos los Sábados".

Televisión Española (1988–1993)
In 1988 entered at the news staff of Televisión Española as main director of Telediario in its two editions. Also was anchor of the news magazine Buenos Días (1989–90).

Antena 3 (1993–2004)
In 1993 joined the news division of Antena 3 Television as anchor and director of the second edition of Antena 3 Noticias. In September 1996 is named as anchor of the -then weekly magazine- Espejo Público. Later, in 1998 assumes the direction of the weekend editions of "A3N" until 2002.

After that he occupied some TV specials as Diario de Guerra and the late-night news program 7 Días, 7 Noches. In March 2004 he anchored the morning magazine La Respuesta.

Back to RNE (2004–2006)
Piqueras left Antena 3 in May 2004 after being named as news director of Radio Nacional de España with target of make RNE a pluralist radio. He left the radio network in 2006 "by a non-professional reason".

Telecinco (2006–present)
On January 25, 2006 Telecinco confirms that Piqueras was named news director of the private channel and news anchor of the 21:00 Edition. Since 2013 the news program its leader of ratings on Spain's evening news

Awards and nominations
 1990: TP de Oro as best news anchor for Telediario (Nominated)
 1997: Two Antena de Oro awards by Espejo Público (Won)
 2003: Premio ATV as best communicator for news programs (Nominated)
 2009: Antena de Oro as best news anchor for Informativos Telecinco.

References

External links
 

1955 births
Living people
People from Albacete
Spanish television journalists